Voronezhselmash produces equipment for post-harvest handling, drying and storing grain, including grain elevators and separators. Construction of grain elevators for turnkey grain storage.

References

Companies based in Voronezh
Manufacturing companies established in 1917
1917 establishments in Russia
Agriculture companies of the Soviet Union